Blonde Ice is a 1948 crime film noir starring Leslie Brooks, Robert Paige, and Michael Whalen.  Based on the 1938 novel Once Too Often by Elwyn Whitman Chambers,  the  B picture was directed by Jack Bernhard, with music by Irving Gertz.

Plot

Claire Cummings, a society columnist for a San Francisco paper, is about to marry Carl Henneman in his opulent mansion. A small group of men - all Claire's old co-workers from the newspaper - comment about Claire being late to her own wedding. At least two of them - Les Burns and Al Herrick - are ex-lovers of Claire's. Claire appears at the top of the stairs as the wedding march begins, making her way down the stairs and into the ceremony. As the ceremony takes place, Les leaves to go stand on the veranda, and Claire watches him, instead of focusing on her wedding. Immediately following the ceremony, Claire slips out to join Les and tells him she still loves him and will continue to see him, despite now being married. She kisses him, which her new husband sees. When Claire re-enters the reception, Carl confronts his new bride, who tells him that Les is like her brother, and the kiss was platonic. Carl believes her.

While on their honeymoon in Los Angeles, Claire and Carl are at the racetrack, arguing about Claire's reckless betting on random horses. Claire thinks it doesn't matter, since Carl's wealthy, but Carl wants her to be more frugal. The couple return to their hotel, where Claire writes a love letter to Les. When Carl enters the room, she hides the letter, but Carl quickly discovers it and tells her he's going to divorce her. At first, she barely reacts, telling Carl that California's a state with community property laws which entitle a spouse to half of a couple's combined holdings. But Carl says he's taking the letter Claire had been writing to Les as proof of adultery, so she won't receive any recompense. Carl leaves, heading back to San Francisco to begin divorce proceedings.

Claire hatches a plan; she heads to an airfield where she finds a pilot, Blackie Talon, who is willing to fly her immediately to San Francisco and back. She pays him extra to buy his silence.

The next morning Claire phones Les and tells him Carl has flown to New York on business and she is planning to return to San Francisco where she'll spend the rest of her honeymoon time with him. She asks Les to arrange a flight for her and to pick her up at the airport. After the pick-up Claire asks him to drive to Carl's mansion so she can get some clothes.

Upon arriving, Les makes a gruesome discovery - Carl's dead body in an easy chair, a gun on the carpet. It looks like suicide. Les phones the police, although Claire seems unfazed. The two are questioned at the police station. The police think Carl's death could not have been suicide as there are no fingerprints on the gun, nor powder burns on his hands or clothes. They suspect Claire, but she has a strong alibi; she states that she was in Los Angeles at the time of the murder and has the plane ticket and Les to back her up.

Les and Claire rekindle their romance, as if her whirlwind marriage and the subsequent death of Carl Henneman had never taken place. One night while out to dinner Claire spots Stanley Mason, an attorney who is currently running for congress. She asks Les about him and brings up the idea of his handling Carl's estate. She arranges an introduction and tells Mason that she could use a good lawyer to handle her late husband's estate. He decides to help her and in no time the pair become lovers.

Les finds himself once again losing Claire to another man. At the same time the police are coming down hard on him, as he is their prime suspect. Les realises there are too many holes in the scenario of Carl's "suicide" and confronts Claire, telling her, "You're not a normal woman. You're not warm. You're cold, like ice. Yeah, like ice - blonde ice."

After Claire has thrown Les out Blackie arrives, demanding $50,000 for his silence. He takes her necklace as a first installment. The next evening, Claire and Stanley are joined at dinner by psychologist Dr. Kippinger, who openly comments on the manipulative aspect of her nature.

With the police having closed Carl's murder case, due to insufficient evidence, Claire is able to relax somewhat. But then Blackie phones, demanding money. Claire drives to meet him but shoots him as he gets out of the car.

At the victory party where Stanley celebrates his election victory, he also announces that he is going to marry Claire. Les leaves in consternation. He is home alone, having a drink, when Claire walks in and tells him she really loves him. He calls her poison. She puts her arms around him and at that moment Stanley walks in. He has come to break off their engagement and nothing Claire can say will dissuade him.

Claire murders Stanley with a knife and when Les walks in, he picks up the knife, making it easy for her to pin the murder on him. The police come and arrest Les but Dr. Kippinger is certain the real murderer is Claire. He confronts her at her newspaper office and discovers that she has written a confession about the murders of Carl, Blackie and Stanley. Claire tries to shoot Dr. Kippinger but misses and as she and Al grapple for the gun she is fatally wounded.

In the final scene, a bunch of people come into the office and look down at the body. Les leaves last, shutting the door behind him.

Cast
 Robert Paige as Les Burns
 Leslie Brooks as Claire Cummings Hanneman

 Russ Vincent as Blackie Talon, the Pilot
 Michael Whalen as Stanley Mason, Attorney
 James Griffith as Al Herrick

 Emory Parnell as Police Capt. Bill Murdock
 Walter Sande as Hack Doyle
 John Holland as Carl Hanneman
 Mildred Coles as June Taylor
 Selmer Jackson as District Attorney Ed Chalmers
 David Leonard as Dr. Geoffrey Kippinger

Critical response
Film critic Dennis Schwartz wrote in 2002, "A minor film noir about a cold-hearted femme fatale who is capable of not only deceit but of murder. It's a precursor to the more hardboiled neo-noir films of today. Jack Bernhard directs a film that is based on a Whitney Chambers story, and allows the storyline to remain an oddity because of how ruthlessly cold and insane the femme fatale character played by Leslie Brooks is presented."

Critic Gary Johnson discussed the production and the storyline in his 2003 review, "The acting is merely adequate and the direction is severely hampered by the low budget (although director Jack Bernhard and cameraman George Robinson do manage a few surprising camera angles). But the screenplay is a deliciously nasty and audacious exposé on the twisted psyche of a truly lethal femme fatale. Claire Cummings is a gold digger with no conscience whatsoever. She's out for herself and if anyone gets in the way, well ... she packs a revolver and a sharp knife.  Claire Cummings is one of the most deadly femme fatales in the history of film noir, easily fitting alongside such other brutal dames as Phyllis Dietrichson from Double Indemnity, Kathie Moffat from Out of the Past, Annie Laurie Starr from Gun Crazy, and Vera from Edgar G. Ulmer's own Detour.

When the movie was released, there was confusion about who the screenwriter was. Some sources state that much acclaimed B movie director Edgar G. Ulmer was the uncredited original screenwriter of Blonde Ice. However, this Appears to be an error due to faulty memory. In a conversation with Peter Bogdanovich, a film director and writer, Ulmer claimed that after the huge box office success of Double Indemnity (1944) he wrote a rip-off script with the working title Single Indemnity for film producer Sigmund Neufeld. He erroneously believed that Neufeld's film was released under the title Blonde Ice. However, Blonde Ice was neither produced by Neufeld nor does its plot resemble that of Double Indemnity. It is believed the film Ulmer was actually referring to is Apology for Murder (1945)

Restoration
Blonde Ice was originality directed by Jack Bernhard, a British-American director responsible for films such as Decoy (1946), Unknown Island (1948), and The Second Face (1950). The film, which in its own time was little regarded as a B Movie, had been considered lost until its reappearance in 2003, when it was restored and re-released to the public by VCI entertainment. 

Blonde Ice was originally created through the production company Film Classics, yet was re-discovered through private collectors and restored by historian Jay Fenton. The restored DVD release of Blonde Ice includes an interview with Fenton, who describes his role as a film collector. 

Although it us illegal to privately own a print copy of a film due to potential copyright infringement (and re-selling pirate copies), collectors such as Fenton have restored works despite the law.

Novel
Much like the film, most copies of the novel have been lost. "Once Too Often" was released in 1938, yet is often referenced as a similar novel published in the same year, "Murder Lady", which was widely released by Chambers in the United Kingdom. The title of this work is now shared with that of a novel written by author Dorothy Simpson in 2016. The two works have no relation to one another, yet the popularity of Simpson's novel Made locating copies of Chambers’ work more difficult.

See also
 List of films in the public domain in the United States

References

External links 

  
 
 
 
 
 
 

1948 films
1948 crime films
American black-and-white films
American crime films
American serial killer films
Film Classics films
Film noir
Films about journalists
Films based on American novels
Films directed by Jack Bernhard
Films set in Los Angeles
Films set in San Francisco
1940s serial killer films
1940s English-language films
1940s American films